Memorial Medical Center may refer to:

 Memorial Medical Center (Modesto, California)
 Memorial Medical Center (Springfield, Illinois)
 Ochsner Baptist Medical Center, New Orleans, Louisiana, formerly known as Memorial Medical Center
 Memorial Medical Center (Las Cruces, New Mexico)

Trauma centers